

Belgium
 Congo Free State –  Théophile Wahis, Governor-General of the Congo Free State (1892–1908)

France
 French Somaliland – 
 Adrien Jules Jean Bonhoure, Governor of French Somaliland (1903–1904)
 Albert Dubarry, acting Governor of French Somaliland (1904)
 Pierre Hubert Auguste Pascal, Governor of French Somaliland (1904–1905)
 Guinea – 
 Paul Jean François Cousturier, Lieutenant-Governor of Guinea (1900–1904)
 Antoine Marie Frezouls, Lieutenant-Governor of Guinea (1904–1906)

Japan
 Taiwan – Kodama Gentarō, Governor-General of Taiwan (26 February 1898 – April 1906)

Portugal
 Angola – 
 Eduardo Augusto Ferreira da Costa, Governor-General of Angola (1903–1904)
 Custódio Miguel de Borja, Governor-General of Angola (1904)
 António Duarte Ramada Curto, Governor-General of Angola (1904–1905)

United Kingdom
 Barotziland-North-Western Rhodesia – Robert Thorne Coryndon, Administrator of Barotziland-North-Western Rhodesia (1900–1907)
 Malta Colony – Charles Clarke, Governor of Malta (1903–1907)
 North-Eastern Rhodesia – Robert Edward Codrington, Administrator of North-Eastern Rhodesia (1900–1907)

Colonial governors
Colonial governors
1904